The casemate du Grand-Lot is an interval casemate CORF of the Maginot line, located in the city of Escherange, in the Lorraine region of France.

Position over the line 
As part of the Angevillers or Œutrange subsector (the two names were used) in the fortified sector of Thionville, the Casemate du Grand-Lot, wearing the designation C 36, is integrated into the "main line of resistance "Between the Rochonvillers work (A 8, whose block 9 is detached near the casemate) to the south-west and the casemate of Escherange West (C 37) to the north-east, within the cross-shot range of the cannons of ouvrage Rochonvillers in the south-west and Molvange in the north-east.

Description 
This double casemate was equipped with two GFM bells, two combinations for Reibel twinning and 47 mm anti-tank gun and two other Reibel twinning slots alone.

History 
The casemate was ordered in 1940 by Lieutenant Klein. The west shooting room covered the highway D 58, which connects the villages of Angevillers and Escherange to the west and block 9 of the Rochonvillers GO (block 9 can be seen from the western bell of the casemate). The shooting room covered the casemate of Escherange Ouest.

Current state  
The casemate has been restored and is now private property, open on certain occasions to the public.

References 

Maginot Line